James Edward George Younger, 5th Viscount Younger of Leckie (born 11 November 1955), is an elected hereditary peer who sits on the Conservative benches in the House of Lords.

Early life
James Younger was born on 11 November 1955. His father was George Younger, 4th Viscount Younger of Leckie, who was a prominent member of Margaret Thatcher's cabinet.

Younger was educated at Winchester College, where he was in the school football team, and the University of St Andrews, where he read medieval history. He holds an MBA from Henley Management College.

Career
Younger now works in the field of personnel management and recruitment.

In June 2010, Younger won the by-election to replace the 14th Earl of Northesk who died in March 2010. Younger inherited his peerage in 2003, after passage of the House of Lords Act 1999, making him one of only a few excepted hereditary members of the House of Lords who was not a member before the act came into force.

Younger is a deputy chairman of the Buckingham Constituency Conservative Association.

On 25 June 2012, Younger was appointed a Lord-in-waiting (Lords Whip). On 9 January 2013, Lord Younger was appointed as Parliamentary Under Secretary of State for Intellectual Property at the Department for Business Innovation and Skills, by the Prime Minister.

On 27 July 2019, he was appointed Parliamentary Under-Secretary of State for Housing, Communities & Local Government in Boris Johnson's ministry.

On 1 January 2023, he was appointed Parliamentary Under-Secretary of State at the Department for Work and Pensions.

References

Living people
1955 births
Conservative Party (UK) Baronesses- and Lords-in-Waiting
Viscounts in the Peerage of the United Kingdom
People educated at Winchester College
Alumni of the University of St Andrews

Hereditary peers elected under the House of Lords Act 1999